John Newton (1725–1807) was an English slave ship master and Anglican clergyman, author of "Amazing Grace".

John Newton may also refer to:

Military
John Newton (engineer) (1823–1895), U.S. Army engineer and Civil War general
John Newton (soldier) (1755–1780), American Revolution soldier, fictionalized as a hero
John H. Newton (1881–1948), American admiral
John T. Newton (1793–1857), American naval officer
John Newton (admiral) (born c. 1959), Royal Canadian Navy officer

Politicians
Sir John Newton, 2nd Baronet (1626–1699), English politician
John Newton (MP for Bristol) see Bristol 1407
John Newton (MP for Derby), see Derby 1473
John Newton (MP for Stafford), see Stafford (1388–1391)
John Newton (Nova Scotia politician) (1727–1811), surveyor and politician in Nova Scotia
John Verdun Newton (1916–1944), military aviator and politician in Western Australia
John Orville Newton (1864-1958), state representative in Maine

Sportsmen
John Newton (bowls), Paralympic lawn bowler from Australia
John Newton (rugby league) (1920–1991), New Zealand rugby league player

Others
John Newton (actor) (born 1965), American actor
John A. Newton (1930–2017), president of the Methodist Conference, president of the Wesley Historical Society
John Newton (trade unionist) (1908–1993), British trade unionist
John B. Newton (1839–1897), Episcopal bishop in Virginia, USA
John E. Newton (judge) (1904–1984), Justice of the Nebraska Supreme Court
John Newton (epidemiologist) (born 1959), UK public health expert
John Newton (poet) (born 1959), New Zealand poet
John Frank Newton (1767-1837), British vegetarianism activist and Zoroastrian
John Gubbins Newton, subject of the 1833 painting John Gubbins Newton and His Sister, Mary Newton

See also
Jack Newton (disambiguation)